The Ultimate Collection is a compilation album by British progressive rock band Emerson, Lake & Palmer, released in 2004.

Track listing

Notes

Essential Emerson, Lake and Palmer, The
Essential Emerson, Lake and Palmer, The